Victor Karlsson (born 18 May 2001) is a Swedish football midfielder who plays for Varbergs BoIS.

References

2001 births
Living people
Swedish footballers
Association football midfielders
Varbergs BoIS players
Division 2 (Swedish football) players
Allsvenskan players